Franz Paul Lachner (2 April 1803 – 20 January 1890) was a German composer and conductor.

Biography
Lachner was born in Rain am Lech to a musical family (his brothers Ignaz, Theodor and Vinzenz also became musicians). He studied music with Simon Sechter and Maximilian, the Abbé Stadler. He conducted at the Theater am Kärntnertor in Vienna. In 1834, he became Kapellmeister at Mannheim. As a result of composers' aesthetic comparisons of Beethoven's symphonic output with efforts afterwards, in 1835, there was a competition in Vienna for the best new symphony sponsored by Tobias Haslinger of the music publishing firm with no fewer than 57 entries. Lachner received first prize with his 5th Symphony Sinfonia passionata, or Preis-Symphonie and became royal Kapellmeister at Munich, becoming a major figure in its musical life, conducting at the opera and various concerts and festivals. His career there came to a sudden end in 1864 after Richard Wagner's disciple Hans von Bülow took over Lachner's duties.  Lachner remained officially in his post on extended leave for a few years until his contract expired.

Work

Lachner was a well-known and prolific composer in his day, though he is not now considered a major composer. His work, influenced by Ludwig van Beethoven and his friend Franz Schubert, is regarded as competent and craftsman-like, but is now generally little known. Among his greatest successes were his opera Catharina Cornaro (1841, preceding Donizetti's opera by three years), his Requiem, and his seventh orchestral suite (1881).

In the present day it may be his organ sonatas (Opp. 175, 176, 177) and chamber music, in particular his music for wind instruments, that receive the most attention, though his string quartets and some of his eight symphonies have been performed and recorded. His songs, some of which are set to the same texts that Schubert used, contributed to the development of the German Lied.

For performances of Cherubini's Médée in Frankfurt in 1855, Lachner composed recitatives to replace the original spoken dialogue, and it was this version, translated into Italian, which was used in many twentieth-century revivals and recordings of that opera, most notably those with Maria Callas in the title role.

References

Further reading

External links

1803 births
1890 deaths
19th-century classical composers
19th-century conductors (music)
19th-century German composers
Composers for harp
German conductors (music)
Composers for piano
String quartet composers
German male conductors (music)
German male classical composers
German opera composers
German Romantic composers
Male opera composers
People from Rain, Swabia
People from the Kingdom of Bavaria